The Magic was a racing schooner yacht, of the New York Yacht Club. She was the first American defender during the 1870 America's Cup hosted in  New York against the 1st British challenger Cambria, representing the Royal Thames Yacht Club of London. The Magic, had 19 owners. Her last owner modified her into a pilot boat at Key West. In 1922, during a hurricane, she was wrecked on the beach in Key West.

Design

The Magic, was built by T. Byerly & Son of Philadelphia in 1857, for Captain Richard Fanning Loper, as a sloop. Loper did the original model and design for his boat. She was christened the Madgie.

She was rebuilt several times, In 1859, Loper modified the Madgie from a sloop to a schooner and renamed her Magic. In 1860, Loper modified Magic by lengthening her bow. He then sold the Magic in 1864, to William H. McVickar of the New York Yacht Club. Yachtsman George L. Lorillard bought the Magic, late in 1866 and sold her to H. W. Gray. In 1869, he sold her to Franklin Osgood. 

In 1869, the Magic, was taken to City Island where she was completely rebuilt by the shipbuilder David Carll. Carll lengthened and widened the Magic, with increased draft; and converted her into a centerboard schooner yacht for Franklin Osgood.

Operational history

The schooner Magic represented the New York Yacht Club and was the smallest sailboat in the international 1870 America's Cup competition. The first official challenge took place on August 8, 1870 in New York Harbor and was won by Franklin Osgood's American yacht Magic. She beat 17 competitors, including the English yacht Cambria and the yachts Dauntless, Idler, Fleetwing, Phantom, America and others.Andrew J. Comstock was captain of the Magic and had a stateroom in the forward section of the boat. 

On October 11, 1870, the Magic was sold by Franklin Osgood to Lester Wallack, for $16,500. Osgood bought her back but sold her to Rufus Hatch in 1873. In 1874, she was purchased by William T. Garner, who kept her until 1876, when Osgood bought her back for a third time. In 1879, she was bought by Francis M. Weld of Boston, who sold her to Thurston N. McKay after owning for only two years. McKay kept her for three years and then she went back to the Weld family in 1885. She was later bought by Augustus W. Mott who kept her for ten years, when John S. Clarke & Bros., of Pittsburg bought her in 1898. He in tern sold her to a Key West group that modified her as a pilot boat.

On February 1, 1908, the Magic sank when she was racing into port and was capsized at Key West. Her owner was John Lowe Jr. The Magic had 19 owners, including the United States Navy, which used her as a supply craft during the 1898 Spanish–American War.

End of service
On May 3, 1922, the schooner Magic, went ashore on the beach in the bay at Key West when she received damage during a hurricane. Her owner, John Lowe Jr., had the boat moved offshore and destroyed with explosives.

References

External links
 City Island Nautical Museum
 THE STORY OF MAGIC

1857 ships
Ships built in New York City
America's Cup challengers
Yachts of New York Yacht Club members
Individual sailing vessels
1870 in American sports
1870 in sailing
America's Cup regattas